Tippecanoe River is a state park in Pulaski County, Indiana, United States. It was formed in 1943 when the National Park Service gifted the land to Indiana's Department of Conservation land to form a state park; other land along the river becoming the Winamac Fish and Wildlife Area. 

Noted for a grove of old-growth white pine trees, the park also preserves more than 2 miles (3 km) of undisturbed wetland shoreline on the Tippecanoe River, attracting some 127,495 visitors in 2018–2019.

History
During the Great Depression of the 1930s, the national government established the Recreational Demonstration Area in the Department of the Interior, National Park Service. The Park Service located low-quality farmlands with high-quality park potential. Along the Tippecanoe River, the Federal Government purchased . The high sand content of the soil made these poor-quality farmlands. The riverway and forest made it quality parklands. Development of the Demonstration Area was undertaken by the Works Progress Administration. In 1943, the property was transferred to the State of Indiana's Department of Conservation as a state park. On January 1, 1959,  were transferred to the Division of Fish and Wildlife as the Winamac Fish and Wildlife Area. The state park retains  of the original development.

River
Canoeing is very popular in the park, as the Tippecanoe River stretches seven miles (11 km) along the park's borders. A canoe-exclusive campsite has ten sites. It is also a river otter release area. Bluegill and bass are commonly fished from the river  The river is too dangerous for swimming, so those camping in the park can go to the Bass Lake State Beach five miles (8 km) away.

Enjoying the park
There are ten miles (16 km) of hiking trails and thirteen miles (20 km) of horseback trails. Cultural arts programs and a seasonal naturalist are also available. Most visitors drive to the park, although pilots can land at the nearby Arens Airport and have a courtesy car take them to the park.

Things to do
 Boating – the park has a small boat launch on the river
 Camping – There are five camping experiences to choose from.
 Family camping
 Potawatomi Group Camp
 Youth Tenting
 Rent-a-camp cabin
 Canoe camping from the river
 Fishing
 Horseback riding – trails and a primitive campground are available to horsemen and -women.

Protected areas
 Sand Hill Nature Preserve is located at the end of the park and is accessible on Trail #8, the Bluestem Trail.
 Tippecanoe River Nature Preserve is along the river near the center of the park. It is accessible on Trail #4, the Oxbow Trail.

References

External links
 
 

Protected areas established in 1943
State parks of Indiana
Protected areas of Pulaski County, Indiana
Works Progress Administration in Indiana